Shaquille Junior Anthony Hunter (born 29 August 1995) is an English former semi-professional footballer who played as a winger, but is now swinging shoulder punches vs Patchway Town in the county league relegation scrap.

Career
Hunter was born in Birmingham, West Midlands. He began his career with Bristol Rovers, firstly as an unused substitute in a second round Football League Cup tie against Leyton Orient on his 16th birthday. In 2012, it was reported that Premier League clubs Fulham, Liverpool and Manchester City were all interested in Hunter. He made his professional debut in a 2–1 defeat against Exeter City on 3 August 2013. He left Rovers in December 2013 due to disciplinary problems. In September 2014 he joined Mangotsfield United, before having a brief spell with Bristol City, although he failed to make any first team appearances for them.

He spent the 2016 pre-season on trial with Bath City, eventually signing a one-year deal at the club.

Personal life
Hunter attended De Montfort University in Leicester, graduating with a Masters of Business Administration MBA. In 2019 he founded soft-drink company "Sip Shack" that as of September 2021 had reached 250,000 sales nationwide.

Career statistics

References

External links

1995 births
Living people
Black British sportspeople
Footballers from Birmingham, West Midlands
English footballers
Association football wingers
Bristol Rovers F.C. players
Mangotsfield United F.C. players
Bristol City F.C. players
Bath City F.C. players
English Football League players
Southern Football League players
Alumni of De Montfort University